Cincinnati Times-Star Building at 800 Broadway Street in Cincinnati, Ohio, is a registered historic building.  It was listed in the National Register on November 25, 1983. It was built in 1933 and was designed by the firm of Samuel Hannaford & Sons in the Art Deco style. The limestone building has 15 stories with a basement and sub-basement beneath. There is no 13th floor as superstitions ran high during this time period. Much of the decorated facade pays homage to the printing and publishing businesses. Two hundred feet above the street stand four pillars at each of the tower's corners; they represent patriotism, truth, speed, and progress.

The newspaper plant occupied the first six stories. The floors above were offices. The Cincinnati Times-Star was an outgrowth of several newspapers and was owned by Cincinnati's Taft family. Charles Phelps Taft was editor.

Before moving into the Times-Star Building on Broadway on January 1, 1933, the newspaper's offices were on Sixth and Walnut streets.

When the Times-Star folded in 1958, its assets were purchased by its rival, The Cincinnati Post, who moved into the building and occupied it until 1984. Hamilton County bought the building in the late 1980s and renamed it the 800 Broadway Building. It is used for county offices and by the juvenile court.

The Building is ornamented wtih Bronze and Nickel Silver Grilles, over the Windows, Front Entrance, and Lobby Interior.

References

Further reading
Cincinnati, a Guide to the Queen City and Its Neighbors, American Guide Series, Weisen-Hart Press, May 1943, page 198.

External links

Cincinnati Times-Star Building circa 1933 
Old Times-Star Building
Main entrance of the Times-Star building
Documentation from the University of Cincinnati

Newspaper headquarters in the United States
Newspaper buildings
Skyscraper office buildings in Cincinnati
Art Deco skyscrapers
Art Deco architecture in Ohio
National Register of Historic Places in Cincinnati
Manufacturing plants in the United States
Limestone buildings in the United States
1933 establishments in Ohio